is a Japanese voice actress from Nagasaki Prefecture. She is affiliated with Mausu Promotion. She is known for voicing Tohru in Miss Kobayashi's Dragon Maid.

Biography
In 2012, she graduated from the Tokyo Announcement College Voice Academy, and entered the Mausu Promotion Actor Training School as a 27th grader. Before entering vocational school, she used self-taught books and books of voice actors at the library, and participated in Romi Park's workshop.

In 2014, she became a member of Mausu Promotion.

Filmography

Television animation
2012
Haitai Nanafa – Eleking (debut)
2013
Shonen Hollywood: Holly Stage for 49 – Female Clerk (Ep 4)
Freezing Vibration – Rattle
2014
Aikatsu! – Anna Kodama, Onnanoko
Himegoto – Hime Arikawa
JoJo's Bizarre Adventure: Stardust Crusaders – Laughing Flower B (Ep 20)
2015
JoJo's Bizarre Adventure: Stardust Crusaders – Visiting Girl A (Ep 28)
Mikagura School Suite – Girl (Ep 3)
Bikini Warriors –  Child A (Ep 1), Woman (Ep 3)
Rokka: Braves of the Six Flowers – Villager (Ep 2)
Yuruyuri – Female student (Ep 1)
Shomin Sample – Hakua Shiotome
Onsen Yōsei Hakone-chan – Miya
Chivalry of a Failed Knight – Kurogane house servant (Ep 9)
2016
Aikatsu Stars! – Chiharu Aoyama, Cecil Minaba, Miss Romance, Naho Aoyama, Coco, Tamaki Miyakōji
Divine Gate – Schoolgirl (Ep 1), Gawain (Ep 3, 6, 7), Elisabeth (Ep 8)
Re:Zero − Starting Life in Another World – Meina (Ep 5, 9, 10)
JoJo's Bizarre Adventure: Diamond Is Unbreakable – High School Girl A (Ep 7), Female Student C (Ep 22)
High School Fleet – Kishima
The Asterisk War – Girl B (Ep 22)
Naria Girls – Inaho
Scorching Ping Pong Girls – Hokuto Itsumo
12-Sai: Chiccha na Mune no Tokimeki – Cramschool Student (Ep 2, 4)
Trickster – Sakura Harukaze (Ep 5),Sayaka Natsukawa (Ep 6), Irai-nushi (Ep 8)
Mobile Suit Gundam: Iron-Blooded Orphans – Cookie Griffon
2017
Miss Kobayashi's Dragon Maid – Tohru
Scum's Wish –  Passerby woman (Ep 8)
Seven Mortal Sins – Bride (Ep 3)
18if – Rina (Ep 9)
A Centaur's Life – Nozomi Gokuraku
In Another World With My Smartphone – Charlotte (Ep 4, 5, 8, 10-12)
Teekyu – Airu Tennouzu (Ep 4, 6)
Gamers! – Konoha Hoshinomori (Ep 8-11)
Konohana Kitan – Older sister (Ep 5)
2018
ClassicaLoid – Ushiko (Eps 14, 16)
Comic Girls – Woman (Ep 4),Store employee (Ep 7),Manuscript character (Ep 12)
Back Street Girls: Gokudols –Hiyuyu (Ep 2)
Captain Tsubasa – Yayoi Aoba
Aikatsu Friends! – Kaguya Shirayuri
Ulysses: Jeanne d'Arc and the Alchemist Knight – Batard (Ep 1, 5-12)
Merc Storia – Titi (Ep 1-11)
As Miss Beelzebub Likes – Astaroth (young) (Ep 4)
2019
If It's for My Daughter, I'd Even Defeat a Demon Lord – Chloe
We Never Learn – Himura (Ep 10,11)
Arifureta: From Commonplace to World's Strongest – Yue 
Boruto: Naruto Next Generations – Isago
Demon Slayer: Kimetsu no Yaiba – Naho Takada (Ep 24-26)
High School Prodigies Have It Easy Even In Another World – Lyrule
Azur Lane – Shigure (Ep 4)
Tenka Hyakken ~Meiji-kan e Yōkoso!~ – Horinuki Masamune 
We Never Learn Season 2 – Himura (Ep 2, 7)
Aikatsu on Parade! – Kaguya Shirayuri
2020
Interspecies Reviewers – Lumen (Ep 6)
Infinite Dendrogram – Juliet (Ep 7)
Super HxEros – Sora Tenkūji
Re:Zero - Starting Life in Another World – Meina (Ep 2)
By the Grace of the Gods – Eliaria Jamil (Ep 1-11)
The Day I Became a God — Sora Narukami
Is the Order a Rabbit? – Anzu (Ep 4, 9)
Love Live! Nijigasaki High School Idol Club – Kyouko (Ep 6, 8, 11-13)
2021
Miss Kobayashi's Dragon Maid S – Tohru
Seirei Gensouki: Spirit Chronicles – Aishia
Dragon Goes House-Hunting – Koropokkuru B (Eps 3, 5)
BUILD-DIVIDE -#000000- CODE BLACK – Azuma Soragi (Ep 8)
Demon Slayer: Kimetsu no Yaiba – Naho Takada (Eps 1-2)
2022
In the Land of Leadale – Guardians
Arifureta: From Commonplace to World's Strongest 2nd Season – Yue
Trapped in a Dating Sim: The World of Otome Games is Tough for Mobs – Follower (Ep 3)

Original video animation (OVA)
2013
Freezing Vibration OVAs – Rattle
2016
Arslan Senki: Gaiden – Maid (Ep 2)
Food Wars!: Shokugeki no Soma Takumi's Shimomachi Battle – Fumiko
Trickster: Edogawa Ranpo "Shounen Tanteidan" yori OVA  – Kimie Ishizawa (Ep 2)
2021
Bottom-tier Character Tomozaki – Kanda

Original net animation (ONA)
2016
Chika Chika Idol – Sumi Yuuki
Brotherhood: Final Fantasy XV –  Student (Ep 2)
2018
Lost Song – Rin (young) (Ep 10)
Itsuka Aeru Kimi ni – Butler
2021
Eden – Zurich

Video games

Fire Emblem Fates (2015) – Effie Ophelia
Fire Emblem: Three Houses (2019) – Hilda Valentine Goneril
Closers (2017) – Harpy
Kirara Fantasia（2017）- Cork 
King’s Raid (2018) – Artemia
Knights Chronicle (2018) – Nemesis
Onsen Musume (2018) – Fuuka Arima
Azur Lane (2018) – Shigure and Nelson
Death end re;Quest (2018) – Lily Hopes
Girls' Frontline (2018) – Thunder
Our World is Ended (2019) – Miyabi Nabi
Magia Record (2019) – Seira Mihono
Fate/Grand Order (2019) – Gareth
Death End Request 2 (2020) – Lily Hopes
Arknights (2020) – Sideroca
Tsukihime -A piece of blue glass moon- (2021) – Kohaku
Alchemy Stars (2022) – Tohru
Sword Art Online: Last Recollection (2023) – Sarai

Others
Ane no Shinyuu, Watashi no Koibito – Kiku (promotional video)

References

External links
 
Official agency profile 

1991 births
Living people
Japanese video game actresses
Japanese voice actresses
Mausu Promotion voice actors
People from Sasebo
Voice actresses from Nagasaki Prefecture